"Video 5 8 6", originally titled "Prime 5 8 6", is an electronic instrumental piece written and produced in 1982 by the British group New Order. In December 1982, the track was initially released in two sections in Touch Music's first cassette magazine, Feature Mist. Touch re-released the entire track as a CD single in 1997.

Composed primarily by Bernard Sumner and Stephen Morris, "Prime 5 8 6"/"Video 5 8 6" was an early version of "5 8 6" (from Power, Corruption & Lies), which contained rhythm elements that would later surface on "Ultraviolence" and the 1983 hit "Blue Monday". After Factory Records' Tony Wilson asked New Order for twenty minutes of "pap", it was first played in public during the opening of The Haçienda on 21 May 1982.

On release it reached #86 on the main British singles chart and #19 on the British indie chart. Bassist Peter Hook has said the key to the title "5 8 6" can be found in another of the group's songs, "Ecstasy"; 5, 8 then 6 is the song's bar structure.

A video was released for the song called Primitive 586 on the FACT 56, IKON 3 VHS and BETA tape 'A Factory Video', the footage is mostly primitive 80s computer graphics.

Track listing

Chart positions

References

New Order (band) songs
1997 singles
1982 songs
Songs written by Bernard Sumner
Songs written by Stephen Morris (musician)